Fort Hill Historic District may refer to:

 Fort Hill Historic District (Northampton, Massachusetts)
 Fort Hill, Boston, neighborhood and historic district
 Fort Hill Rural Historic District, Eastham, Massachusetts 
 Rogers Fort Hill Park Historic District, Lowell, Massachusetts
 Nelson Avenue-Fort Hill Historic District, Peekskill, New York

See also
 Fort Hill (disambiguation)